Lucas Herbert may refer to:

Lucas Herbert (golfer) (born 1995), Australian golfer
Lucas Herbert (footballer) (born 1977), Australian rules footballer